The Game of Love is an English-language musical based on the German plays Anatol and Anatols Größenwahn ("Anatol's megalomania") by Austrian playwright Arthur Schnitzler. It is set in late 19th century Vienna, and chronicles the many shallow and immature relationships of bourgeois playboy Anatol. The musical is based on the translation of the play by Tom Jones. The lyrics are written by Jones, and the music is by Jacques Offenbach, with musical arrangements and additional music by Nancy Ford.

Productions 
Jones and Ford began work on the musical in 1965.

The musical had its Off-Broadway premiere in 2012.

A production of the musical was staged at Station Theater in Champaign, Illinois in 2012 and at the University of Miami in 2016.

Musical numbers 

 In Vienna - Max
 I Love To Be In Love - Anatol, Max
 The Hypnotism Song - Cora, Anatol, Max
 The Music Of Bavaria - Annie, Fritz
 Finishing With An Affair - Anatol, waiters
 The Oyster Waltz - Annie, waiters
 Come Buy A Trinket - Peddlers
 There's A Room - Anatol, Gabriele
 Anatol's Last Night - Anatol
 Love Conquers All - Ilona, Anatol, Max
 Listen To The Rain - Ilona
 Seasons - Max
 It's For The Young - Anatol, Max
 Menage-A-Trois - Baron Diebel
 There's A Flower I Wear - Annette
 The Game Of Love - All

Main characters 

 Anatol - the protagonist
 Max - Anatol's friend
 Cora - a love interest of Anatol
 Annie - a love interest of Anatol
 Gabriele - a former lover of Anatol
 Ilona - a love interest of Anatol
 Annette - a love interest of Anatol
 Baron Diebel - an aging playboy

References 

1965 musicals
Musicals based on plays